Anne Charrier is a French actress, who is credited with 7 films and 22 TV productions between 2000 and 2009.
She was coached for TV by the Australian Elise McLeod.

Career

She is best known for her lead role in the film Paid, made in 2006, where she played a French call girl from Netherlands. The film was exhibited at the 22nd Braunschweig International Film Festival.  Charrier made her film debut in this production though she has had over 20 TV credits.

Theater

Filmography

References

External links 

Paid  at film.com
Paid at Lagestee Film BV

French film actresses
Living people
1974 births
French television actresses
21st-century French actresses